Little League elbow is a condition that is caused by repetitive throwing motions, especially in children who play sports that involve an overhand throw. "Little Leaguer's elbow" was coined by Brogdon and Crow in an eponymous 1960 article in the American Journal of Radiology.

The name of the condition is derived from the game of baseball. Compared to athletes who play other sports, baseball players are at higher risk of overuse injuries and injuries caused by early sports specialization by children and teenagers.

Little League elbow is most often seen in young pitchers under the age of sixteen. The pitching motion causes a valgus stress to be placed on the elbow joint which can cause damage to the structures of the elbow, resulting in an avulsion of the medial epiphyseal plate (growth plate).

The first diagnosis of the injury in 1960 set off a firestorm of controversy regarding how much youth baseball players can and should be asked to pitch. The ailment even appeared in the comic strip Peanuts in 1963 when Charlie Brown received a diagnosis. In 2007, in order to protect against overuse injuries, Little League Baseball began limiting the number of pitches a player could throw per day.

Adult pitchers do not experience the same injury because they do not have an open growth plate in the elbow. Instead, in adult athletes a more common injury is to the ulnar collateral ligament of the elbow, an injury that often requires Tommy John surgery in order for the athlete to resume high-level competitive throwing.

See also
 Tennis elbow
 Golfer's elbow
 Repetitive strain injury
 Radial tunnel syndrome
 Panner disease

References

External links 
 Emedicine article

Baseball pitching
Little League
Overuse injuries
Sports injuries